Carelessly Yours is the fourth studio album released by Swedish pop singer Ola.

It was released in Sweden in January 2014, and debuted at number four on the official Swedish Albums Chart.  It is Ola's first release through Sony Music Entertainment. It spawned the hit single "I'm in Love", that was a hit for Ola in Italy, his first in that country reaching number four on the Italian Singles Chart. The album subsequently resulted in two minor hits, "Maybe" and "Jackie Kennedy", the latter charting again in Italy.

Track listing

Charts

References

Ola Svensson albums
2014 albums